Degerberget Fort is a modern fort, part of Boden Fortress, outside the city of Boden, Norrbotten, in northern Sweden. The fort was finished in 1908 but improvements were also continuously made during, and between, both World Wars. Besides its military role, the fort also served as storage for part of the Swedish gold reserve for over 40 years. Degerberget Fort was decommissioned in 1992.

Background 

Boden Fortress was built to act as the operational base for all troops attached for the defence of Norrbotten, and serve as a supply fortress for troops stationed between it and the front line, as well as a blocking fortress in case of a Russian surprise attack.

Construction 

Degerberget Fort was planned and constructed on Degerberget Mountain, north of Boden and west of the lake Buddbyträsket, between 1900 and 1908. It was the only fort in the northern fort group as defined in the 1914 defensive plans for Boden Fortress.

Armament 

The main artillery consisted of four 12 cm Kanon m/99, backed up by another four 8.4 cm Kanon m/94-04 which were replaced by 8.4 cm Kanon m/47 in the early 1950s. Surrounded by a caponier ditch on all sides, the fort area also features one observation post, two searchlight sites and two larger bunkers.

History 

Part of the Swedish gold reserve was kept here from 1941 to 1982. Degerberget Fort was decommissioned in 1992 together with Gammelängsberget Fort.

Citations

References 
All sources in  unless otherwise noted.
Books

Journals

News

Online

 

Other
 Boden Fortress exhibition at Försvarsmuseum Boden. Visited on 2006-07-28.
Rödberget Fort guided tour by Fästningsguiden i Norr AB. Visited on 2006-07-28.

Reference notes

External links 
Swedish National Property Board - Boden Fortress 
Bodens fästning & Rödbergsfortet 

Boden Fortress
Military installations established in 1908
Buildings and structures in Norrbotten County
1908 establishments in Sweden